The A447 is a road in Leicestershire, England, which links traffic from Hinckley to Coalville.

Route

Hinckley - Ibstock
Starting on the A47 crossroad in Hinckley, it heads for
Market Bosworth then passing the junction with the B585 then it heads for Ibstock.

Ibstock - Coalville
Leaving Ibstock, it heads for Ravenstone then it heads onto Coalville, ending here.

History
The original (1922) route of the A447 was Wolvey to Tonge, via Hinckley, Ibstock and Coalville, but they were changes in the early years.

Wolvey to Hinckley
The route from Wolvey to Hinckley was renumbered B4109.

Coalville to Tonge
The route from Coalville to Tonge is unknown.

Roads in England
Transport in Leicestershire